Hehe, also known by its native name  , is a Bantu language that is spoken by the Hehe people of the Iringa region of Tanzania, lying south of the Great Ruaha River. It was reported to have "Ngoni" features, that is, words of a Zulu-like language introduced when conquered by a Nguni or Zulu-like people in the early 19th century. However, other "Ngoni" speeches seem to have lost most of these distinctive features over the past 150-odd years, the language more resembling those of the neighbouring peoples. In 1977 it was estimated that 190,000 people spoke Hehe. There has been some Bible translation (British and Foreign Bible Society).  Hehe may be mutually intelligible with Bena.

Grammar 

Hehe has 15 noun classes, marked with prefixes.

Hehe has a complex tense-aspect-mood system.

Phonology

Consonants 

 [ʍ] can be heard as an allophone of /w/ among speakers in free variation.
 [z] occurs in the language, but is mainly heard as an allophone of /s/ after nasal sounds, or as a result of Swahili loanwords.

Vowels

References

Languages of Tanzania
Northeast Bantu languages